The men's bantamweight event was part of the boxing programme at the 1976 Summer Olympics. The weight class allowed boxers of up to 54 kilograms to compete. The competition was held from 18 to 31 July 1976. 27 boxers from 27 nations competed.

Medalists

Results
The following boxers took part in the event:

First round
 Jovito Rengifo (VEN) def. Baker Muwanga (UGA), 5:0
 Chul Soon-Hwang (KOR) def. Anthony Houliaras (GRE), 5:0
 Tumat Sogolik (PNG) def. Samuel Meck (CMR), walk-over
 Charles Mooney (USA) def. Mohamed Rais (MAR), 5:0
 Juan Francisco Rodríguez (ESP) def. Anthony Abacheng (GHA), 5:0
 Bernardo Onori (ITA) def. Abdelnabi El-Sayed (EGY), 5:0
 Brian Tink (AUS) def. Giubran Zugdani (LIB), walk-over

Second round
 Rey Fortaleza (PHI) def. Evan Parris (GUY), walk-over
 Ekenwa Ezikpe (NGA) – Costo Assogba (TOG), both walk-over
 Patrick Cowdell (GBR) def. Leszek Borkowski (POL), 5:0
 Alejandro Silva (PUR) def. George Findo (KEN), walk-over
 Chacho Andreykovski (BUL) def. Aldo Cosentino (FRA), KO-3
 Gu Yong-Ju (PRK) def. Faredin Ibrahim (ROM), 4:1
 Weerachart Saturngrun (THA) def. Kemal Sonunur (TUR), 5:0
 Chris Ius (CAN) def. Mohamed Ayele (ETH), walk-over
 Zassia Ouaudrogo (BUR) – Hamidou Banhamni (NIG), both walk-over
 Stephan Förster (GDR) def. Jozsef Jakab (HUN), 5:0
 Hitoshi Ishigaki (JPN) def. Francisco Sanchez (DOM), DSQ-2
 Viktor Rybakov (URS) def. Alfred Siame (ZAM), walk-over
 Orlando Martínez (CUB) def. Jovito Rengifo (VEN), 5:0
 Chul Soon-Hwang (KOR) def. Tumat Sogolik (PNG), KO-2
 Charles Mooney (USA) def. Juan Francisco Rodríguez (ESP), 4:1
 Bernardo Onori (ITA) def. Brian Tink (AUS), 5:0

Third round
 Rey Fortaleza (PHI) – no opponent (bye)
 Patrick Cowdell (GBR) def. Alejandro Silva (PUR), 5:0
 Gu Yong-Ju (PRK) def. Chacho Andreykovski (BUL), 5:0
 Weerachart Saturngrun (THA) def. Chris Ius (CAN), 5:0
 Stephan Förster (GDR) – no opponent (bye)
 Viktor Rybakov (URS) def. Hitoshi Ishigaki (JPN), 5:0
 Chul Soon-Hwang (KOR) def. Orlando Martínez (CUB), 3:2
 Charles Mooney (USA) def. Bernardo Onori (ITA), 5:0

Quarterfinals
 Patrick Cowdell (GBR) def. Rey Fortaleza (PHI), 4:1
 Gu Yong-Ju (PRK) def. Weerachart Saturngrun (THA), 5:0
 Viktor Rybakov (URS) def. Stephan Förster (GDR), 3:2
 Charles Mooney (USA) def. Chul Soon-Hwang (KOR), 3:2

Semifinals
 Gu Yong-Ju (PRK) def. Patrick Cowdell (GBR), 4:1
 Charles Mooney (USA) def. Viktor Rybakov (URS), 4:1

Final
 Gu Yong-Ju (PRK) def. Charles Mooney (USA), 5:0

References

Bantamweight